How To Cook That (often stylised as H2CT) is an Australian website and YouTube baking channel that provides video recipes on baking and decorating themed cakes, desserts, chocolate creations and other confectionery. Launched as a website in 2011 by founder Ann Reardon, it later gained more than 4 million followers on YouTube, surpassing more than 15.3 million video views per month. The channel has been featured in major publications, including Forbes, The Huffington Post, and The Sydney Morning Herald.

History

How To Cook That was founded by Ann Reardon in 2011. Prior to becoming a YouTube personality, she worked as a qualified food scientist and dietitian. She left the field of food to work with youth as a youth pastor in a low socioeconomic area in Western Australia. She self-catered for various events. During that time, Reardon taught many of the young people how to cook in her own kitchen.

In 2009, Reardon moved to Sydney, Australia, with her family and initially launched How To Cook That as a website that contained both video recipes and an online shop. The site was launched after she had her third son as something to keep her mind active during night feeds. Reardon wrote a single recipe post each week and made occasional videos to complement the recipes. The videos were too large for the site so she uploaded them to YouTube and embedded them into the website. As the popularity of the videos grew, Reardon started uploading them more frequently.

Views started in the thousands and grew to millions, attracting media attention. In 2013, Reardon was contacted by the BBC to produce a cake for the 50th anniversary of Doctor Who. She made a chocolate Dalek cake that was later featured on the BBC as well as Variety. The same year, Reardon signed an agreement with DECA, a YouTube multi-channel network based in the United States. She also began a brand partnership in December 2013, using appliances by Breville who supplied her with products for giveaways.

Subscriber numbers grew rapidly with the increased media attention and by February 2014 the channel had 450,000 subscribers and averaged 3.7 million video views per month, making it Australia's most popular YouTube baking channel and the third most popular worldwide. By August of that same year, it had over 770,000 subscribers and received more than 5.3 million video views for the month. At the end of 2014, the channel surpassed 1,000,000 subscribers, with over 100 million views in total, and was featured in Tubefilter News. By February 2015, the channel was attracting 14 million views in a single month.

Content

Recipes on How To Cook That feature mainly desserts, including cakes decorated as cartoon characters, social media logos, and giant classic candy bars. Some of the most popular include a 5 lb Snickers bar, an Instagram cake, and a giant Kit Kat chocolate. The Instagram cake was featured in The Huffington Post as well as over 500 websites. The recipe for an Avengers cake was featured in an article on CNET, and Reardon also developed a recipe for a YouTube cake. The website sells its own products, including cake templates.

In addition to the website and YouTube channel, Reardon released a mobile app called Surprise Cakes in the Apple Store and on Google Play. It is considered the world's first augmented reality app for cakes and was inspired by a gaming app. The app allows users to make a cake come to life with 3D moving dragons, unicorns, rainbows and fireworks.

Other reoccurring segments include:

 Clever or Never: where Reardon (usually accompanied by her husband Dave) tests a bunch of kitchen gadgets to see how useful they are.
 Miniature Baking: where Reardon makes recipes in a dollhouse fitted with a fully functioning kitchen. Her miniature baking includes making tiny eggs using sodium alginate.
 200 year old recipes: where Reardon makes recipes from her collection of old cook books, most of which are between 100-200 years old. She also makes more historically significant recipes, including the first recipe written down in English.
 Cake Rescue: where Reardon tries to rescue viral cake fails.
 Hit Or Myth: where Reardon tests baking hacks to see how useful they are.  
 The Sweetest Thing: where Reardon travels across Australia, talking to pastry chefs to learn more about their passion and the creation of a specific cake. This series was made as part of an arts grant that Reardon received, so it had a much higher production value then what she was making at the time.
 Exposing the food industry: where Reardon gives an insight into a particular part or problem within the food industry. Some topics have included: chocolate, false advertising, bananas, and meat production.
 Giant Chocolate Bar: where Reardon makes a giant version of a well known chocolate bar, and gifts it to a person or charity "doing giant things."
 Viewer Challenges: where Reardon attempts challenges sent in by her viewers, including creating the Minecraft cake with only the ingredients listed in the game, and following a Bob Ross tutorial but using chocolate instead of paint.
 Gingerbread House: a yearly Christmas series where Reardon makes a unique (and rather complex) gingerbread house. 

In more recent years, Reardon has shifted to disproving false/misleading viral claims, often testing "food hacks" (recipes that supposedly show an easy way to make an existing dish or a new one) to show their impossibility and warn viewers of more dangerous trends.  Reardon often debunks and calls out large content farms such as Five Minute Crafts, Blossom, So Yummy, Troom Troom, Buzzfeed and YumUp,  as well as many other channels producing recipe and life hack content that is often fake (ice cream frosting,) dangerous (wrapping someone’s head in plastic wrap to avoid onion fumes,) irresponsible (washing clothes with eco soap in a natural stream,) useless (using a toilet lid as a portable table) and unnecessarily complicated (cutting a cake with toothpicks and dental floss.) Reardon often says that these videos are "the fake news of the baking world."

See also
 List of YouTube personalities

References

External links
 How To Cook That official website
 How To Cook That YouTube channel

Internet properties established in 2011
Australian YouTubers
YouTube channels launched in 2011
Cooking websites
Food and cooking YouTube channels
English-language YouTube channels